The Faculty of Technology formerly faculty of engineering sciences is an Algerian faculty, located in the city of Boumerdès, Algeria. It is part of the University of Boumerdès. It was established in 1998 and it comprises eight departments.

History
Under the supervision of the Ministry of Industry and Energy, in 1964 they created the African center for hydrocarbons and textiles. Then in 1973 they divided the center into two national institutes:
 INHC: National Institute of Hydrocarbons and Chemistry (French: Institut National des Hydrocarbures et de la Chimie).
 INIL: National Institute of Light Industries (French: Institut National des Industries Légères).

In 1980 and under the supervision of the Ministry of Heavy Industry, INELEC and INGM were established 
 INELEC: National Institute of Electrical and Electronic Engineering (French: Institut National de Génie Electrique et Electronique).
 INGM: National Institute of Mechanical Engineering (French: Institut National de Génie Mécanique).

in June 2, 1998 and by the executive decree n ° 98-189 they created the University of Boumerdès, and the National Institute of Mechanical Engineering becomes faculty of engineering sciences, Then in 2019 the name was changed to Faculty of Technology.

Programs

Undergraduate
The undergraduate bachelor's degree program in the Faculty of Technology is 3-5 years. A bachelor's degree from the University of Algeria is called "الليسانس" in Arabic and la license in French. The course usually lasts three years and is part of the LMD reform ("license", "master's", "doctor"). After graduation, students can enrol for a bachelor's degree (National Secondary School Examination) in various fields of study. Once licensed, each student can complete a two-year master's degree. Then he took the doctoral exam.

Departments
The Faculty of Technology includes the following eight departments:
 Industrial Process Engineering
 Food Technology
 Environmental Engineering
 Mechanical Engineering
 Energetics
 Industrial maintenance
 Materials Engineering
 Civil Engineering

References

External links
 Official Website: 
 Faculty of Technology Facebook page

Faculty of Technology